Hakim Sadi (born 14 November 1992) is an Algerian long distance runner. He placed 104th in the marathon at the 2016 Summer Olympics.

References

External links

 

1992 births
Living people
Algerian male long-distance runners
Algerian male marathon runners
Place of birth missing (living people)
Athletes (track and field) at the 2016 Summer Olympics
Olympic athletes of Algeria
21st-century Algerian people
20th-century Algerian people